Fayodia bisphaerigera is a species of fungi in the family Tricholomataceae, and the type species of the genus Fayodia. The species was originally named Omphalia bisphaerigera by Jakob Emanuel Lange, and later transferred to Fayodia in 1936 by Rolf Singer. It is found in Asia, Europe, and North America.

References

External links

Tricholomataceae
Fungi of Asia
Fungi of Europe
Fungi of North America